Elections in Sabah have been held in the Malaysian state of Sabah since 1967 and have chosen Sabah's elected representatives in the Dewan Rakyat and Dewan Undangan Negeri (the Malaysian federal and state assemblies).

Federal level

Federal constituencies
 List of former Malaysian federal electoral districts#Sabah
 List of Malaysian electoral districts#Sabah

General elections

1969 general election

1974 general election

1978 general election

1982 general election

1986 general election

1990 general election

1995 general election

1999 general election

2004 general election

2008 general election

2013 general election

2018 general election

2022 general election

State level

State constituencies
 List of former Malaysian state electoral districts#Sabah

State elections

1967 state election

1971 state election

1976 state election

1981 state election

1985 state election

1986 state election

1990 state election

1994 state election

1999 state election

2004 state election

2008 state election

2013 state election

2018 state election

2020 state election

References 

 
Elections in Malaysia